Jeffrey D. Cooper is a Canadian retired ice hockey goaltender who was an All-American for Colgate.

Career
Cooper arrived at Colgate University and joined the ice hockey team a year after making its first ever NCAA Tournament appearance. He played as a backup in his freshman season and transitioned into the starting role as a sophomore. Cooper was so vital for the defense that he was named as the team's best defensive player for three consecutive years. Unfortunately, Colgate's offense didn't keep pace with the defense and the team finished 10th in ECAC Hockey, missing the postseason entirely in Cooper's first year as a starter.

In Cooper's junior season, the offense was still rather paltry but he and the defense played well enough to give the team just the second 20-win season in program history. He set program records for wins (18), games played (32), and saves (944) and got the Red Raiders back into the playoffs, albeit for just one game. As a senior he played nearly as well, setting a program career record with his 6th shoutout and was named an All-American.

After graduating, Cooper signed a contract with the Pittsburgh Penguins and began playing in their farm system. After an unspectacular season with the Baltimore Skipjacks, Cooper had his breakout campaign with the Muskegon Lumberjacks in 1987. He tied for the league lead with a 3.30 goals against average and was named as a First Team All-Star while helping Muskegon win their conference. Unfortunately, in the postseason the team decided to use Frank Pietrangelo as the starter and Cooper played in just one playoff game as the team marched all the way to the finals. Cooper was never able to recapture the magic he had found in 1987 and played for four different minor league teams over the next three seasons, mostly as a backup. He retired after the 1990 season.

In 1998, Cooper was inducted into the Colgate Athletic Hall of Fame. more than a decade later he became the goaltending coach for the Vermont women's team, resigning in 2014 after the team posted its first 10+ win season.

Statistics

Regular season and playoffs

Awards and honors

References

External links

1962 births
Living people
AHCA Division I men's ice hockey All-Americans
Canadian ice hockey goaltenders
Ice hockey people from Ottawa
Colgate Raiders men's ice hockey players
Baltimore Skipjacks players
Muskegon Lumberjacks players
New Haven Nighthawks players
Saginaw Hawks players
Indianapolis Ice players